"Piensa en mí", is a 1935 song written by Agustín Lara and his sister Maria Teresa Lara.

Versions
Luz Casal sings the song on the soundtrack of Pedro Almodóvar's High Heels included in her album A Contraluz.
Marinella on Me Varka To Tragoudi 1999
Pink Martini on Splendor in the Grass (album) 2009
Pasión (Roberto Alagna album) 2011
Natalia Lafourcade on Mujer Divina – Homenaje a Agustín Lara 2012

References

1935 songs
Songs with music by Agustín Lara